A district or gu is an administrative unit in South Korea.

List of districts in South Korea

Renamed districts 
 Nam District → Michuhol, Incheon (1 July 2018)
 Ilsan-gu → Ilsandong-gu, Goyang (16 May 2005)
 Buk District → Bupyeong District, Incheon (1 March 1995)
 Jung-gu → Wonmi-gu, Bucheon (1 February 1993)
 Nam-gu → Sosa-gu, Bucheon (1 February 1993)

Defunct districts 
 Happo-gu, Masan (1 July 1990 – 1 January 2001)
 Hoewon-gu, Masan (1 July 1990 – 1 January 2001)
 Ulju-gu, Ulsan (1 January 1995 – 15 July 1997)
 Ojeong-gu, Bucheon (1 February 1993 – 4 July 2016)
 Sosa-gu, Bucheon (1 January 1988 – 4 July 2016)
 Wonmi-gu, Bucheon (1 January 1988 – 4 July 2016)

See also 
 Administrative divisions of South Korea

References 

 
Districts